Uzbekistan participated in the 2014 Asian Games in Incheon, South Korea from 19 September to 4 October 2014.

Medal summary

Medal table

Medalists

References

http://www.incheon2014.kr/Sports/Medals/MenuMedallists/?discipline=ALL&Date=ALL&NOC=UZB&lang=en

Nations at the 2014 Asian Games
2014
Asian Games